Louis de Lorraine known as the Cardinal de Guise (22 January 1575 – 21 June 1621, Saintes) was the third son of Henry I, Duke of Guise and Catherine of Cleves.

Life
His ecclesiastical post was entirely a sinecure; he was never ordained, and led a dissipated life. Nevertheless, he was made Archbishop of Reims in January 1605, and created cardinal on December 2, 1615. He incurred the displeasure of Louis XIII of France, and was imprisoned in the Bastille in 1620. He joined the royal campaign to besiege the Huguenot stronghold of Montauban in 1621, and there fell ill with scarlet fever and died.

He married, in secret, Charlotte des Essarts, Mademoiselle de La Haye in 1611. They had five children:

 Charles Louis (d. July 12, 1668, Auteuil), Abbot of Chaalis, Bishop of Condom
 Achille (c. 1615–1648, Heraklion), Prince of Guise, Count of Romorantin, killed in the siege of Candia, married Anna Maria of Salm-Dhaun
 Charlotte (d. bef. 1664), Abbess of St. Pierre, Lyon
 Henri Hector (b. 1620)
 Louise (d. July 5, 1662), married October 24, 1639 Claude Pot, Lord of Rhodes (d. August 3, 1642)

Ancestry

References

Sources

1575 births
1621 deaths
Louis III
Louis III
French untitled nobility
17th-century French cardinals
Archbishops of Reims
17th-century peers of France
Prisoners of the Bastille